The UPEI Panthers women's basketball team represents the University of Prince Edward Island in the Atlantic University Sport conference of U Sports women's basketball. The Panthers have the fourth-most Atlantic Conference Championships (six), with their most recent for the 2019–20 season. The 2019–20 team also won the bronze medal at the 2020 U Sports Women's Basketball Championship.

History
During the 2019-20 regular season, UPEI finished in first place in AUS play, enjoying a 17-3 record. Jenna Mae Ellsworth emerged as the Panthers top scorer, averaging 20.5 points per game. In addition, Ellsworth averaged 5.9 rebounds, 3.2 assists and 2.1 steals per game. By season’s end, she reached 1,231 career points, enabling her in a second-place on the Panthers all-time scoring list. Winning the Nann Copp Award, Ellsworth became just the third Atlantic University Sport conference player to be recognized.

In the postseason, the Panthers captured the Subway AUS Women’s Basketball Championship, representing its first postseason conference title since the 1997-98 campaign. Qualifying for the U Sports Elite 8, the Panthers were the sixth seed. Defeating the third-seeded Ryerson Rams in the opening round, the Panthers played for the bronze medal. Defeating the Laval Rouge et Or by a 57-50 final, Ellsworth recorded 24 points and nine rebounds in the victory.

U Sports Elite 8 results

Individual Leader Scoring

Awards and honours
Jenna Mae Ellsworth would win the 2020 Nan Copp Award, recognizing U Sports Player of the Year. During the same month, Ellsworth was also named to the list of the Top 100 U Sports Women’s Basketball Players of the Century (2011-2020).

AUS Awards
2019-20 AUS Female Athlete of the Year: Jenna Mae Ellsworth

Player of the Year
1985-86	Paula Edwards
1998-99	Jennifer Johnston
2020 AUS Player of the Year: Jenna Mae Ellsworth

Defensive Player of the Year
2017-18: Carolina Del Santo, UPEI
2018-19: Carolina Del Santo
2019-20: Jenna Mae Ellsworth

Rookie of the Year
1984-85	Paula Edwards
2016-17	Jenna Mae Ellsworth
2017-18	Reese Baxendale

Student-Athlete Community Service Award
2017-18: Kiera Rigby

Tracey MacLeod Award Nominee
2013-14: Jenna Jones
2017-18: Jane McLaughlin

Regular Season Scoring Champions
2006-07: M.A. Campbell, (17.7 PPG)
1998-99: Jennifer Johnston, (20.1 PPG)

Coach of the Year
The Coach of the Year in Atlantic University Sport is given the Carolyn Savoy Trophy
1980-81: George Morrison Co-winner
1983-84: Dave MacNeill
1985-86	Dave MacNeill
1986-87	Dave MacNeill
1987-88: Dave MacNeill
1991-92: Dave MacNeill
1992-93: Dave MacNeill
1996-97: Tracy Ellsworth

AUS All-Stars
First Team
2017-18 AUS First Team All-Star: Kiera Rigby
2019-20 AUS First Team All-Star: Jenna Mae Ellsworth

Second Team
2018-19 AUS Second Team All-Star: Jenna Mae Ellsworth
2017-18 AUS Second Team All-Star: Jenna Mae Ellsworth
2016-17 AUS Second Team All-Star: Jenna Mae Ellsworth

AUS All-Rookie Team
2016-17 All-Rookie team: Jenna Mae Ellsworth
2017-18 Reese Baxendale

Tournament All-Stars
2017-18 AUS Women's Basketball Championship All-Star: Reese Baxendale
2017-18 AUS Women's Basketball Championship All-Star: Jenna Mae Ellsworth
2020 Subway AUS Women’s Basketball Championship All-Tournament Team: Jenna Mae Ellsworth

U Sports Awards
2020 Nan Copp Award: Jenna Mae Ellsworth
Top 100 U Sports women's basketball Players of the Century (1920-2020): Jenna Mae Ellsworth
2017-18 U Sports Sylvia Sweeney Community Service Award: Kiera Rigby

U Sports National Tournament
 Nike Top Performers - March 8, 2020 - Bronze Medal Game: UPEI vs. Laval - UPEI: Reese Baxendale

All-Canadian
2019-20  U SPORTS First Team All-Canadian: Jenna Mae Ellsworth

University Awards
PEI Panthers Passion for Life Award (in memory of former UPEI soccer player Rene Ayangma)
2016-17: Kiera Rigby

PEI Panthers Female Athlete of the Year
2014-15: Amy Gough
2015-16: Katelynn Donahoe Co-winner 
2017-18: Kiera Rigby
2019-20: Jenna Mae Ellsworth

J.T. 'Mickey' Place Awards
Presented by the UPEI Student Union to student-athletes who have made a contribution to student leadership on their team and on campus.

2014-15: Darcy Zinck
2015-16: Katie Donahoe
2016-17: Kiera Rigby
2017-18:
2018-19: Carolina Del Santo

Most Valuable Player
2014-15: Amy Gough
2015-16: Katie Donahoe
2016-17: Kiera Rigby
2017-18:
2018-19: Jenna Mae Ellsworth

Rookie of the Year
2015-16: Kendra Craswell and Jennifer Newman
2016-17: Jenna Mae Ellsworth
2017-18:
2018-19: Carolina Del Santo

PEI Panthers Hall of Fame
2001 inductee: Paula Edwards
2002 inductee: UPEI Women's Basketball team 1988-1989
2003 inductee: Tracy MacEachern
2012 inductee: Jennifer Johnston

References 

U Sports women's basketball teams
Sport in Charlottetown
University of Prince Edward Island
Women in Prince Edward Island